Sabail raion is a raion of Baku, located on the Caspian shore. It contains the Old town of Baku and the Baku Boulevard as well as  the settlements Badamdar and Bibiheybət, the administrative territorial divisions no. 1 and no. 2, the municipalities of Badamdar, Bibiheybət and Sabail, and is bordered by the raions of Nasimi, Yasamal and Garadagh.

Area: 29 km2. Population: 100,500 (2016).

Originally named Bayil Bibi-Heybat, the raion assumed the name of Joseph Stalin in 1931 and in 1960 was renamed after 26 Baku Commissars. On April 29, 1992 the raion gained the name of Sabail, the historical architectural ensemble about 350 m south-west to the Baku Bay.

Current head of the raion's executive power is Eldar Azizov (since 2015). The governing body includes the juridical, socio-economic and other departments.

History
Sabail is the name of a historical monument (castle) built in the 13th century located near the Baku Bay and remained under the sea water due to tectonic activities in the 14th century. Sabail Castle surrounded with a stone wall (180 m length and 40 m width) consisting of 3 circular and 12 semicircular towers.

The castle was named distinctly in various sources as the City under water, Bayil Stones, Caravansarai. There is also a legend about the name Sabail coming from Saba city located near Baku.

About
The Office of Azerbaijan President, Milli Majlis, Cabinet of Ministers,  Constitutional Court , Executive Power of Baku city, Government House, a few ministries, state committees, 13 embassies to Azerbaijan, offices of international organizations and companies are located in Sabail raion.

Popular destinations of citizens and tourists, like Martyrs' Avenue, Alley of Honor, Heydar Aliyev Foundation, Mugham Center, Old City, National Flag Square, Fountains Square, Nizami str, Baku Boulevard, Azadliq Square, Baku Funicular are in the area of this raion as well.

There are 5 universities, 17 schools, 18 kindergartens,  3 creative centers for children, 3 sport schools, 3 music schools, 22 health centers, 2 sport complexes, 47 hotels, additionally, 7 theaters, 5 libraries, 16 museums, 5 culture houses, 4 parks, 18 leisure gardens in this region.

Sport 
Azerbaijani professional football club Sabail based in Sabail. The club competes in the Azerbaijan Premier League.

See also
 Executive Power of Baku city
 Administrative divisions of Azerbaijan

References

External links
 Executive Power of Sabail raion

Districts of Baku